The 1983–84 season was the 38th season in Rijeka’s history and their 22nd season in the Yugoslav First League. Their 15th place finish in the 1982–83 season meant it was their tenth successive season playing in the Yugoslav First League.

Competitions

Yugoslav First League

Classification

Results summary

Results by round

Matches

First League

Source: rsssf.com

Yugoslav Cup

Source: rsssf.com

Squad statistics
Competitive matches only.  Appearances in brackets indicate numbers of times the player came on as a substitute.

See also
1983–84 Yugoslav First League
1983–84 Yugoslav Cup

References

External sources
 1983–84 Yugoslav First League at rsssf.com
 Prvenstvo 1983.-84. at nk-rijeka.hr

HNK Rijeka seasons
Rijeka